Alabama has played a central role in the development of both blues and country music. Appalachian folk music, fiddle music, gospel, spirituals, and polka have had local scenes in parts of Alabama. The Tuskegee Institute's School of Music (established 1931), especially the Tuskegee Choir, is an internationally renowned institution. There are three major modern orchestras, the Mobile Symphony, the Alabama Symphony Orchestra and the Huntsville Symphony Orchestra; the last is the oldest continuously operating professional orchestra in the state, giving its first performance in 1955.

State song

The state song of Alabama is entitled "Alabama". It was written by Julia Tutwiler and composed by Edna Gockel Gussen. It was adopted as the state song in 1931.

A State Senate bill (SB-458) was passed 32–1 in 2000 to move "Alabama" to the status of State Anthem, with "Stars Fell On Alabama", a song written in 1933 whose most popular release was by Jimmy Buffett in 1972 becoming the new State Song, and "My Home's in Alabama" (1980) by the Country group Alabama would become the State Ballad, but the bill failed in the State House.

Other grass roots efforts to make "Sweet Home Alabama" (1974) by Lynyrd Skynyrd the state song have also failed, but the song's potential official status made a comeback when the State Tourism Agency chose the song as the centerpiece of its 2008 marketing campaign.

Recording studios
Muscle Shoals, Alabama is renowned worldwide as one of the epicenters of the music industry, having been the birthplace of a number of classic recordings. The studios of the Muscle Shoals area (Florence, Sheffield, Muscle Shoals, and Tuscumbia) figure prominently in the history of rock, country and R&B through the 1960s, 70s & 80s. FAME Studios, Muscle Shoals Sound Studios, Wishbone Studios, Quinvy Studios, East Avalon Recorders/ClearDay Studio, and others have recorded local musicians and international superstars alike. Notable artists have included Aretha Franklin, Rolling Stones, Lynyrd Skynyrd, Otis Redding, Wilson Pickett, Bob Dylan, Paul Simon, Rod Stewart, Willie Nelson, Hank Williams Jr, Roy Orbison, and countless others have recorded there. The notable studio house bands include The Muscle Shoals Rhythm Section, The Swampers, The Muscle Shoals Horns, and The Fame Gang.

Though not as popular a recording center as before, Muscle Shoals continues to be an important contributor to American popular music and is home to a number of the world's most successful songwriters, musicians and producers. Single Lock Records currently operates a recording studio, record label, and performance venue in the area.

The Hangout Music Festival (est. 2010) is an annual 3-day music festival held at the public beaches of Gulf Shores, Alabama.

Halls of fame

The Alabama Music Hall of Fame was created by the Alabama state legislature as a state agency in 1980. A 12,500 square foot (1,200 m²) exhibit hall opened in Tuscumbia in 1990.

The Alabama Jazz Hall of Fame (AJHoF) is located in Birmingham, housed in the historic Carver Theatre. It was founded in 1978 and opened a museum in 1993.

Styles of music

Indigenous music

Soul/R&B
Many artists in the realms of rhythm and blues and soul music have emerged from Alabama over the past 50 years, including Wilson Pickett, Percy Sledge, Martha Reeves of Martha and the Vandellas. Rick Hall established FAME Studios. In 1966, Rick Hall helped license Percy Sledge's "When a Man Loves a Woman", produced by Quin Ivy, to Atlantic Records, which then led to a regular arrangement under which Atlantic would send musicians to Hall's Muscle Shoals studio to record. The studio produced further hit records for Wilson Pickett, James & Bobby Purify, Aretha Franklin, Clarence Carter, Arthur Conley, and Otis Redding enhancing Hall's reputation as a white Southern producer who could produce and engineer hits for black Southern soul singers. He produced many sessions using guitarist Duane Allman. Dan Penn and Spooner Oldham wrote "I'm Your Puppet" for James & Bobby Purify. Members of The Commodores are from Tuskegee.

Rock/Pop
Rock and pop musicians from Alabama are Southern rock/pop/R&B band Wet Willie, the rock band Brother Cane, the power pop band Hotel of Birmingham, Bill McCorvey of the country band Pirates of the Mississippi, songwriter/producer Walt Aldridge, and Tommy Shaw of the rock band Styx. Dan Penn, from Alabama , worked with the Box Tops. The Birmingham area has had more than its fair share of American Idol contestants do well, including second season winner Ruben Studdard (who played football for Alabama A&M University).

Blues and Jazz

WC Handy, often referred to as the "father of the blues", was born and raised in Florence, Alabama, which since 1982 holds an annual WC Handy Music Festival "to preserve, present, and promote the musical heritage of Northwest Alabama". The festival is usually held in the summer, and cake and other foods are typically served.

Piedmont and country blues singer, guitarist, and songwriter Ed Bell was born near Fort Deposit.

Though born in Frayser, a community in North Memphis, Tennessee, Johnny Shines, Blues singer and guitarist, moved to Holt, Alabama, in Tuscaloosa County, in 1969, where he lived until he died. Shines died on April 20, 1992, in Tuscaloosa, Alabama.[1] He was inducted into the Blues Hall of Fame later the same year.

Alabama has a rich jazz heritage, being the birthplace of such greats as Lionel Hampton, Erskine Hawkins, Nat King Cole, Cleveland Eaton, James Reese Europe, Cootie Williams, William Manuel Johnson, Urbie Green, Ward Swingle, Cow Cow Davenport, members of Take 6 and many more. Tubist Howard Johnson of the Saturday Night Live band hails from Montgomery. The museum of the Alabama Jazz Hall of Fame honors many of these fine musicians. In the 1930s and 40s, college dance bands, such as the Alabama Cavaliers, the Auburn Knights and the Bama State Collegians played an important role in the history of jazz in the South. Birmingham, Alabama boasts several active big bands, including the SuperJazz Big Band, the Joe Giattina Orchestra, the Night Flight Big Band and the Magic City Jazz Orchestra, founded and directed by Ray Reach. In addition, there is a world-class horn section, the Tuscaloosa Horns, comprising some of Alabama's finest jazz/soul/funk instrumentalists. Also the newest/youngest break out big band in Alabama which incorporates everything from Duke Ellington to Bob Marley; the New South Jazz Orchestra which prominently features the Tuscaloosa Horns and the composing/arranging skills of members of the Tuscaloosa Horns.

Ward Swingle, world-famous multiple Grammy Award-winning jazz vocal composer and pianist, hails from Mobile.

Birmingham contributed prominently to the history of jazz in America. It is the hometown of numerous influential jazz musicians, including bassist Cleveland Eaton, pianist and vocalist Ray Reach, guitarist Johnny Smith, trumpeter and bandleader Erskine Hawkins, trumpeter and arranger Tommy Stewart, trumpeter Nelson Williams, composer Hugh Martin, arranger Sammy Lowe, bandleader Sun Ra, vibraphonist and bandleader Lionel Hampton, singer and guitarist Odetta, John Propst (pianist for Pete Fountain and Boots Randolph) and many more. Historical areas such as Tuxedo Junction and the Fourth Avenue Historic District played an important role in the evolution of jazz in Birmingham and the United States.

Gospel
Gospel music has an especially long tradition in the state, among both the white and black populations. Given the strongly religious coloring of Alabama's population historically, the genre is one example of many shared phenomena between the historically segregated cultures of the state. The two traditions are, however, distinct, and entail key distinctions, with Southern gospel incorporating elements of bluegrass and country music more strongly than "black" gospel.

Celtic
The state also has a Celtic music scene, which has produced bands like Henri's Notions, After Class, and the Birmingham-based harpist Cynthia Douglass, as well as a number of piping bands and promotional Celtic organizations.

Sacred Harp
Alabama is the leading state for Sacred Harp singing. More annual singings are held in Alabama than in any other state. The Sacred Harp: Revised Cooper Edition, a version of The Sacred Harp used across the southern parts of Georgia, Alabama, Mississippi, and Texas, is published by the Sacred Harp Book Company of Samson, Alabama. The Sacred Harp/Shape Note Music and Cultural Center is located in Bessemer, Alabama.

Country, Bluegrass, and Old-time Music
The State of Alabama has a rich history in country, bluegrass  and old-time music. The influence of Mississippi Delta blues to the west and the ancient sounds of Appalachian Folk Music to the north blend with native Jazz sounds to form a brand of country music with a unique Alabama flavor. "Country music may be recorded in Nashville, but it was born in the Heart of Dixie." (Will Vincent, Tall Pines Bluegrass).

North Alabama's contribution to bluegrass music over the years has been exceptional. From former "Bluegrass Boys" Rual Yarbrough and Jake Landers, mandolin virtuoso Hershel Sizemore, fiddling legend Al Lester and the incomparable Claire Lynch, to modern day country-star-turned-bluegrass artist Marty Raybon, the list goes on and on.

Probably one of the most well-known musicians to ever hail from Alabama is Hank Williams Sr., born in Georgiana. Hank's hits include "I'm So Lonesome I Could Cry", "Lost Highway" and "Jambalaya (On the Bayou)". Hank and his wife Audrey are both buried in Oakwood Cemetery in Montgomery where the Hank Williams Museum resides downtown. A section of Interstate 65 between Georgiana and Montgomery was commemorated the "Lost Highway" in memory of Williams in 1997.

Other notable residents include Jimmy Buffett, though born in Pascagoula, Mississippi, grew up in the Mobile area. Country star Tammy Wynette was born on the Mississippi/Alabama line. The Louvin Brothers were pioneers of tight harmony country and bluegrass vocalizations. Vern Gosdin is another influential country music legend who came from the state of Alabama. Emmylou Harris was born in Birmingham. Shenandoah from Muscle Shoals became major stars. The group Alabama from Fort Payne is often credited with bringing country music groups (as opposed to solo vocalists) into the mainstream, paving the way for the success of today's top country groups.

Musicians from Alabama

Members of the Alabama Music Hall of Fame
Alabama – country superstar band, based in Fort Payne
Arthur Alexander – country-soul songwriter and singer, born in Sheffield
Ernest Ashworth – country star and a member of the Grand Ole Opry for 44 years, known for his hit "Talk Back Trembling Lips", from Huntsville
Blind Boys of Alabama – gospel group, based in Talladega
Clarence Carter –  blues and soul singer, musician, songwriter and record producer, born in Montgomery
Nat King Cole – jazz and R&B musician/songwriter, born in Montgomery (d.1965)
The Commodores – soul/funk group formed in Tuskegee, had two number one Hot 100 hits, such as "Three Times a Lady" in 1978
William Levi Dawson – composer, organizer of the Tuskegee School of Music, from Anniston
Delmore Brothers – from Elkmont
Cleveland Eaton – jazz bassist, veteran of the Count Basie Orchestra and the Ramsey Lewis Trio, from Birmingham
James Reese Europe – ragtime and early jazz bandleader, arranger, and composer, born in Mobile
Eddie Floyd – soul-R&B singer and songwriter, born in Montgomery
Joe L. Frank – country music promoter from Mt. Rozell
Donna Jean Godchaux –  singer, best known for having been a member of the Grateful Dead from 1972 until 1979, born in Florence
Rick Hall – record producer from Franklin County
W.C. Handy – father of the blues, born in Florence
Emmylou Harris – country singer/songwriter, born in Birmingham
Erskine Hawkins – big band leader
Jake Hess – gospel singer from Limestone County
Sonny James – early country star, born in Hacklebug
James Joiner – founder of Tune Recording Studio, songwriter, from Florence
Jamey Johnson – singer, songwriter, and ACM and CMA award winner from Enterprise
Buddy Killen – record producer and founder of Dial Records, executive at Tree Publishing
Louvin Brothers – influential close harmony group, from Section
Chuck Leavell – keyboardist, former member of the Allman Brothers Band, sideman for Eric Clapton and the Rolling Stones
Eddie Levert – founding member of The O'Jays, born in Bessemer
Rose Maddox – country singer-songwriter and fiddle player, who was the lead singer with the Maddox Brothers and Rose before a successful solo career, born in Boaz
Muscle Shoals Rhythm Section – renowned studio band, consisting of Jimmy Johnson, guitar, Roger Hawkins, drums, David Hood, bass, and Barry Beckett, keyboards
Jim Nabors – actor and singer of standards and gospel, born in Sylacauga, attended the University of Alabama
Odetta – singer, actress, guitarist, lyricist, and a civil and human rights activist, born in Birmingham
Spooner Oldham – songwriter & keyboardist, born in Centre
Dan Penn – singer, songwriter & record producer, from Vernon
Sam Phillips – founder of Sun Records, born in Florence
Wilson Pickett – R&B star, born in Prattville
Curly Putman – songwriter from Princeton
Martha Reeves – Motown lead singer, born in Eufaula
Lionel Richie – singer/songwriter, see also Commodores, born in Tuskegee, had five number one Hot 100 hits, including "All Night Long (All Night)" in 1983
Jimmie Rodgers – early country star, born in Geiger (d.1933)
Tommy Shaw –  guitarist, singer, songwriter, rock bands Damn Yankees and Styx. Born in Prattville
Billy Sherrill – country producer, with 74 top 10 hits, born in Phil Campbell
Percy Sledge – 1960s soul star, born in Leighton
Candi Staton – singer-songwriter, born in Hanceville
Sun Ra – jazz musician and composer, born in Birmingham
The Temptations – four members: Eddie Kendricks (Union Springs), Paul Williams (Birmingham), Melvin Franklin (Montgomery), and Dennis Edwards (Fairfield)
Dinah Washington – jazz and blues singer, born in Tuscaloosa
Wet Willie – Southern rock band from Mobile
Jerry Wexler – New Yorker with Atlantic Records, responsible for the rise of Muscle Shoals
John T. "Fess" Whatley – music educator, worked with the Jazz Demons, the first jazz band in Birmingham
Hank Williams – country music pioneer, born in Georgiana (d. 1953), buried in Montgomery
Tammy Wynette – country singer, lived in Red Bay (d.1998)

Other musicians from Alabama
 
Act of Congress – band from Helena
Alabama Shakes – band from Athens, had a number one Billboard 200 album Sound & Color in 2015
Jonathan Alverson – singer/songwriter, guitarist, country music artist born in Gadsden
 Andaaza – electronic musician (Suomisaundi, Goa trance), Artur Jackson, born in Huntsville (Artist Bio at Mathematician Records, Andaaza Project Website)
Hank Ballard – R&B performer and songwriter, wrote "The Twist", lived in Bessemer
The Band Perry – country trio from Mobile
Belle Adair – indie pop-rock band from Florence
Bo Bice – runner-up, American Idol Season 4
Bibi Black – trumpeter from Huntsville
The Bridges – band from Oxford
Tony Brook – songwriter, from Luverne
Brother Cane – alternative band, based in Birmingham
Adam Brown – singer/songwriter originally from Hartselle
 Damon Johnson American guitarist, vocalist, and songwriter, currently a solo artist and member of Thin Lizzy. In the 1990s he co-founded Brother Cane, and later joined Alice Cooper's band as lead guitarist from Geraldine, Alabama
 Doyle Bright - rock - metal, singer / songwriter / guitarist originally from Vestavia Hills, Alabama
 Eric Dover an American guitarist and singer, most notably with Jellyfish, Slash's Snakepit, Imperial Drag, and Alice Cooper, from Jasper, Alabama
Jimmy Buffett – popular singer/songwriter, from Mobile, attended Auburn University for a year
Oteil Burbridge – jazz bassist, member of the Allman Brothers Band, from Birmingham
Larry Byrom – rock guitarist, from Huntsville
Cannibal JoNeS – Southern alternative death blues from Gordo
Nell Carter – Broadway and TV, born in Birmingham
Course of Nature – alternative rock band from Enterprise
Seaborn McDaniel Denson – Sacred Harp teacher and composer
Thomas Jackson Denson – Sacred Harp teacher and composer
The Dirty Clergy – garage rock/pop band from Marion County
The Dexateens – rock band, originated out of Tuscaloosa
Doe B – rapper from Montgomery
Drive-By Truckers – alternative rock band of Shoals-area natives
Ronnie Eades – "Fame Gang", Muscle Shoals Horns, saxophone, raised in Tarrant
Eddie Floyd – R&B singer, born in Montgomery
Flo Milli - rapper from Mobile
William Lee Golden – baritone singer with the country & gospel group The Oakridge Boys, lives in Brewton
Gucci Mane – rapper from Bessemer
Lionel Hampton – jazz vibes pioneer, lived in Birmingham
Ty Herndon – country singer, lives in Butler
Taylor Hicks – winner, American Idol Season 5, had a number one Hot 100 hit with "Do I Make You Proud" in 2006
Brent Hinds – singer/songwriter and guitarist, from Pelham, of heavy metal band Mastodon
Charlie Hodge – musician for Elvis Presley, member of the "Memphis Mafia", born in Decatur
Lonnie Holley, artist and musician from Birmingham, Dust-to-Digital Records 
Adam Hood – singer/songwriter from Opelika
Hotel – pop-rock band from Birmingham from 1973–1982, recorded 2 albums with MCA Records, some chart success; very popular regional act in their day
The Immortal Lee County Killers – punk blues band from Auburn, 1999–2007
Jason Isbell & the 400 Unit – an Americana band from Muscle Shoals, had a number four album on the Billboard 200 with The Nashville Sound in 2017
Joe – from Opelika, had a number one Hot 100 hit with "Stutter" ft. Mystikal in 2001
Jamey Johnson – Montgomery, AL
Merle Kilgore – country musician, lived in Cullman
Will Kimbrough – singer/songwriter, producer, guitarist, multi-instrumentalist, lived in Mobile
Frederick Knight – R&B singer, songwriter and record producer, born in Birmingham
Nicolette Larson – 1970s songwriter, lived in Birmingham
Lot Lizard – Psychedelic doom metal group from Marshall Co.
Marty Lott, a.k.a. "The Phantom" – rockabilly, born in Prichard
Shelby Lynne – country music artist, singer-songwriter from St Stephens 
Maddox Brothers and Rose – influential early country group, from Boaz
Man or Astro-man? – surf rock revivalists, Auburn
Maylene and the Sons of Disaster – Southern metal band based out of Birmingham
Brian McKnight – R&B singer and producer, born in Huntsville
Allison Moorer – Academy Award nominated country folk musician from Frankville
Rex Oggs – singer/songwriter, born in Elba
Tommy Oliver – pedal steel guitarist, lives in Tuscumbia
Wayne Perkins – guitarist, singer, songwriter, Muscle Shoals studio musician, played on Rolling Stones album, from Birmingham
Susanna Phillips – soprano, winner of the Metropolitan Opera's 2010 Beverly Sills Artist Award, born in Huntsville
The Pierces – Catherine & Allison Pierce, singers from Birmingham
Shane Porter – founder of the New South Jazz Orchestra, published composer/arranger, free-lance trumpeter, pianist, member of the Tuscaloosa Horns, from Tuscaloosa
Mac Powell – founding member of Christian Rock band Third Day – born in Clanton
 Michael Pyle – songwriter, producer. Born in Birmingham, raised in Muscle Shoals.
Ray Reach – jazz pianist, from Birmingham
Rich Boy – rapper, real name Maurice Richards, born 1985 in Mobile
Rush of Fools – alternative Christian band from Birmingham.
Scufflegrit – alternative country band based out of Guin
Sex Clark Five – strum and drum, alternative rock from Huntsville
The Skeeters – alt. country band from Ft. Payne
Some Dark Holler – band from Birmingham
St. Paul & the Broken Bones – soul band from Birmingham
State Line Mob – Southern rock, Country duo group, Florence & Muscle Shoals natives, 2008 Winners of 2 Muscle Shoals music awards for Best new artist & Best new country album of the year.
Tommy Stewart – composer, arranger, pianist and trumpeter based in Birmingham
Ruben Studdard – winner of American Idol, Born in Birmingham
Take 6 – contemporary gospel group, from Huntsville
Maria Taylor – singer from Birmingham
Toni Tennille – half of 1970s hitmakers Captain & Tennille, born in Montgomery
Willie Mae "Big Momma" Thornton – blues and R&B artist, born in Ariton
Thrasher Brothers – gospel group, based in Birmingham
Tres Locos - blues/rock trio from the Huntsville area
Trust Company – rock band from Montgomery
The Tuscaloosa Horns – Mart Avant (trumpet), Chris Gordon (trumpet), Shane Porter (trumpet), Jim Moeller (trombone), Demondrae Thurman (trombone), Chad Fisher (trombone), Steve Black (saxophone), Kelley ONeal (saxophone), Mace Hibbard (saxophone), Jerry Ball (saxophone), Jimmy Bowland (saxophone), Steven Collins (saxophone), Jon Noffsinger (saxophone)
Will Vincent – bluegrass singer and musician, Talladega
Drake White – from Hokes Bluff
Waxahatchee – an indie music project by musician Katie Crutchfield from Birmingham
Gary Wheat – saxophonist residing in Birmingham
John Paul White – alt-folk musician, former member of The Civil Wars, resides in Florence, Alabama
Hank Williams Jr. – country music star, lived in Cullman, Alabama
Yelawolf – (Michael Wayne Atha) rapper and singer-songwriter from Gadsden

See also
 List of songs about Alabama
 List of songs about Birmingham, Alabama
 WLAY (AM)

References

External links
Alabama Music Hall of Fame
Download traditional music
Alabama Symphony Orchestra
The Tuscaloosa Horns
Alabama Jazz Hall of Fame
Birmingham Live Music
New South Jazz Orchestra

 
Alabama culture
Alabama
Alabama